John Foster (30 May 1830 - 4 June 1880), was an English architect and partner in the architectural practice of Foster & Wood of Park Street, Bristol who designed a number of well known buildings erected in Bristol in the 19th century. "It must sometimes seem that the whole of 19th-century Bristol, or at least all of its significant buildings, owed their design to the firm of Foster and Wood".

Early life
Foster was born in the parish of Westbury-on-Trym, now a suburb of Bristol, but then in Gloucestershire, on 30 May 1830. He was baptised at the parish church of St Augustine the Less, which stood next to Bristol Cathedral on College Green, on 25 June 1830. He was the son of Thomas Foster and his wife, Sarah Fowler. The Fosters were a well-known family of local architects and surveyors and John joined his father's firm in the 1840s

Foster & Wood architects
Joseph Wood (1822-1905) had worked with Foster's father, Thomas, who died in 1849, and from 1849 the firm was known as Foster & Wood. In 1854 Joseph Wood married John Foster's sister, Catherine, and of their two sons, Thomas Foster Wood and Joseph Foster Wood, Joseph is known to have been associated with the practice. Foster & Wood have been described as the "most active and ..most consistent architectural firm in Bristol" and it has been suggested that John Foster specialised in the Italianate style favoured in the mid nineteenth century, while Joseph Wood's work inclined to the Gothic. Their work ranged from church building and restoration to the design of schools, workhouses, private dwellings and commercial property.

Bristol buildings

The following buildings were designed by the practice during John Foster's lifetime. 
1853: The Athenaeum, Corn Street
1855: Victoria Square, Clifton, South West Range
1857: Muller's Orphanage, Ashley Down (second stage work begun 1855)
1859: Royal Promenade, Queen's Road
1861: Foster's Almshouse, Colston Street
1861: Archway to Boyce's Avenue, Victoria Square
1862: Temple Colston School, Victoria Street
1864: Grand Hotel, Broad Street
1864: Colston Hall, Colston Street
1867: Bristol Museum and Library, Queen's Road
1875: Bristol Grammar School, University Road
1878: Bengough's Almshouse, Horfield Road

Ecclesiastical architecture

Foster & Wood were responsible for ecclesiastical restorations throughout the West Country, as well as further afield. 
1854: Arley Chapel, Arley Hill (total cost about £3900)
1855/6: Congregational Church, Hill Street, Clevedon, Somerset
1856: Moravian Church, Kingswood, Gloucestershire
1856/7: Holy Trinity, Burrington, Somerset restoration
1862: St John the Evangelist's Church, Kenn, Somerset restoration
1864/5: St Lawrence's church, Wick St Lawrence, Somerset restoration
1869: St David's Church Prendergast, Pembrokeshire rebuilding
1871: St George's Brandon Hill, fittings
1871/2: St Michael and All Angels, Dinder, Somerset restoration

Methodist connection

Joseph Wood was the son of a Wesleyan minister, also called Joseph Wood, and it has been said that the firm had a near monopoly of Methodist building in the city. 
1857: Wesleyan Day School, Backfields
1858: Wesleyan Chapel, Midsomer Norton, Somereset
1860: Victoria Wesleyan Church, Queen's Road
1860: Hanham Wesleyan Schools
1864: Wesleyan Church, Portland Street, Kingsdown
1879: Methodist chapel, Front Street, Churchill, Somerset

Buildings outside Bristol

1850: Frankfort Hall, Clevedon, Somerset
1857: Wrington School, Somerset
1859/60 Market Hall, Midsomer Norton, Somerset
1859: Ilfracombe Schools, Devon

Later life
Foster continued to live with his family, first in Park Street and then at South Parade, Clifton, until his marriage on 9 April 1874 at St John's Church, Taunton to Catherine Walkey Gillett, daughter of George Gillett. Foster & Wood appeared regularly in the local newspapers as architects and surveyors to the Bristol Charities Trust, but there is a pause in their activity between 1873 and 1876, which is probably related to Foster's health; his obituary says he died after a long illness. Directories gave his residence as Weston Villa, Carlton Place between 1875 and 1878. He died on 4 June 1880 at Chelsea.

References 

1830 births
1880 deaths
19th-century English architects
People from Westbury-on-Trym
English ecclesiastical architects
Architects from Bristol